Montelupo Albese is a comune (municipality) in the Province of Cuneo in the Italian region Piedmont, located about  southeast of Turin and about  northeast of Cuneo.

Montelupo Albese borders the following municipalities: Diano d'Alba, Rodello, Serralunga d'Alba, and Sinio.

References 

Cities and towns in Piedmont